SS Lake Illawarra was a handysize bulk carrier of 7,274 tons in the service of the Australian National Line. This ship is known for causing the Tasman Bridge disaster when she collided with pylon 19 of Hobart's giant high concrete arch style Tasman Bridge on the evening of 5 January 1975 at 9.27 pm, resulting in the deaths of 12 people.

Ship details
Lake Illawarra was built by BHP, Whyalla, South Australia. Her keel was laid in June 1956, and she was launched on 28 September 1957. She was delivered from the shipyard on 28 March 1958.

Collision and sinking

Lake Illawarra was loaded with zinc concentrate, for EZ Industries' Risdon Zinc Works, about  up the River Derwent from the bridge.

Just before the impact, Captain Boleslaw Pelc realised as he passed Rosny Point that he was off course, and traveling too fast. He tried to correct the heading, but managed only to bring the bow too far to port (left) and was now heading for the western shore. He urgently counter-corrected, but could not make the opening. Realising he was headed for a collision, he ordered the engine full astern, but the torque from her propeller caused the ship to slide in a broadside movement. She smashed into the 18th and 19th pylons.

The collision brought down the two support pylons and a  section of steel and concrete. There was evening traffic on the bridge, and although no vehicles were on the section that fell, four cars drove off the gap, with five people killed. Two cars stopped on the edge, their occupants able to escape. Seven of the ship's crew died in the accident.

The ship and the debris pile were deemed unsafe to move; the ship's bunker oil was pumped out, and the bow was removed at a later date. The wreck is deep enough not to be a navigational hazard.

The subsequent Court of Marine Inquiry found that Lake Illawarra was capable of passing beneath the bridge's central navigation span, but the captain instead attempted to pass through one of the eastern spans, due to a combination of strong tidal currents and inattention. The Court found that Pelc had not handled Lake Illawarra in a proper and seamanlike manner, and suspended his master's certificate for six months. A pilot service was introduced in response to the court's findings.

Memorial

The plaque contains the following text:

S.S. "Lake Illawarra"

5.1.1975 on Derwent River, Hobart
7274 ton steam turbine bulk carrier
crew of 42, cargo 10,000 tons of zinc
collided with Tasman Bridge and sank
causing loss of 7 crew*, 5 motorists.
A.Campbell*, A.Robinson*, C.Maddigan*
L.Mendizabel*, T.Sheridan*, R.Rezek
J.Stokoe, A.Sward, P.Sward
Missing G.Kemp*, R.Turner*, Dr T.Jones~

References

External links
Tasman Bridge Disaster page 1

Shipwrecks of Tasmania
Shipwrecks in rivers
Maritime incidents in 1975
1958 ships
Ships built in South Australia